This page lists Japan-related articles with romanized titles beginning with the letter J. For names of people, please list by surname (i.e., "Tarō Yamada" should be listed under "Y", not "T"). Please also ignore particles (e.g. "a", "an", "the") when listing articles (i.e., "A City with No People" should be listed under "City").

J
J. League
J-Air
J-pop
Just Bring It (album)

Ja
Jaleco
JALways
Jam Films
Janken
Japan
Japan Academy Prize (academics)
Japan Academy Prize (film)
Japan Aerospace Exploration Agency
Japan Air System
Japanese kimono
Japan Airlines
Japan Airlines Flight 123
Japan Asia Airways
Japan Australia Migratory Bird Agreement
Japan Business Federation
Japan Computer Access Network
Japan Institute of Labour
Japan Lutheran Church
Japan Mennonite Brethren Conference
Japan Meteorological Agency
Japan on Foot
Japan Post
Japan Prize
Japan Railway
Japan Self-Defense Forces
Japan Series
Japan Standard Time
The Japan Times
Japan Tobacco
Japan Transocean Air
Japan Trench
Japanese addressing system
Japanese aircraft carrier Akagi
Japanese aircraft carrier Hiryū
Japanese aircraft carrier Hiyō
Japanese aircraft carrier Hōshō
Japanese aircraft carrier Junyō
Japanese aircraft carrier Kaga
Japanese aircraft carrier Shōhō
Japanese aircraft carrier Shōkaku
Japanese aircraft carrier Sōryū
Japanese aircraft carrier Zuikaku
Japanese aircraft carrier Zuihō
Japanese Alps
Japanese American
Japanese American Internment
Japanese angelica tree
Japanese archery
Japanese art
Japanese Baseball Hall of Fame
Japanese battleship Fusō
Japanese battleship Haruna
Japanese battleship Hiei
Japanese battleship Hyūga
Japanese battleship Ise
Japanese battleship Kirishima
Japanese battleship Kongo
Japanese battleship Mikasa
Japanese battleship Musashi
Japanese battleship Mutsu
Japanese battleship Nagato
Japanese battleship Yamashiro
Japanese battleship Yamato
Japanese beetle
Japanese black pine
Japanese Bobtail
Japanese bondage
Japanese Buddhism
Japanese bush warbler
Japanese calendar
Japanese calligraphy
Japanese Canadian
Japanese cell phone culture
Japanese clans
Japanese clothing
Japanese Communist Party
Japanese copyright law
Japanese counter word
Japanese crafts
Japanese cruiser Haguro
Japanese cruiser Izumo
Japanese cruiser Kuma
Japanese destroyer Ikazuchi
Japanese dialects
Japanese Dolls
Japanese era name
Japanese expansionism
Japanese Experiment Module
Japanese Cultural Festival
Japanese festivals
Japanese Foreign minister
Japanese Funeral
Japanese games
2000 Japanese general election
2003 Japanese general election
Japanese grammar
Japanese Grand Prix
Japanese gunboat Akagi
Japanese hip hop
Japanese history textbook controversies
Japanese honeysuckle
Japanese Improvised Armored Train
Japanese Industrial Standard
Japanese input methods
Japanese Instrument of Surrender
Japanese invasions of Korea (1592-1598)
Japanese kitchen knives
Japanese knotweed
Japanese-Korean disputes
Japanese language
Japanese language and computers
Japanese Language Proficiency Test
Japanese law
Japanese literature
Japanese macaque
Japanese military aircraft designation systems
Japanese military yen
Japanese mythology
Japanese name
Japanese National Railways
Japanese nationalism
Japanese New Year
Japanese numerals
Japanese Orthodox Church
Japanese Peace Bell
Japanese people
Japanese pottery
Japanese proverbs
Japanese Red Army
Japanese Red Cross
Japanese red pine
Japanese robin
Japanese rose
Japanese ryō
Japanese saw
Japanese school uniform
Japanese sea lion
Japanese ship naming conventions
Japanese sports
Japanese submarine I-400
Japanese submarine I-52 (1943)
Japanese tea ceremony
Japanese television programs
Japanese titles
Japanese toilet
Japanese traditional dance
Japanese TV dramas
Japanese veterans in overseas interventions (1894–1927)
Japanese war crimes
Japanese white pine
Japanese Wikipedia
Japanese writing system
Japanese yen
Japonic languages

Je
Jean-François de Galaup, comte de La Pérouse
Milia Fallyna Jenius
JET Programme

Ji
Jidai Matsuri
Jigglypuff
Jigoro Kano
Jikininki
Jim Breen
Jimi's Book of Japanese: A Motivating Method to Learn Japanese
Jimokuji, Aichi
Jingū of Japan
Jinseki District, Hiroshima
Jinseki, Hiroshima
Jirachi
Jiro Watanabe
JIS encoding
Jito
Jizo

Jo
Jō
Jobo District, Okayama
Jōchō
Jōdō
Jodo Shinshu
Jōetsu
Joetsu, Niigata
Jōetsu Shinkansen
Jōge, Hiroshima
Jōhen, Ehime
Joint Communiqué of the Government of Japan and the Government of the People's Republic of China
Jojima, Fukuoka
JoJo's Bizarre Adventure
Jōkei (sculptor)
Jōkyū War
Jōmon period
Jōnan, Kumamoto
Josei
Joseph Hardy Neesima
Joso, Ibaraki
Joyo, Fukuoka
Joyo, Kyoto
Jōyō kanji

Jr
JR Kobe Line
JR Kyoto Line
JR Namba Station

Js
JSL romanization

Ju
Ju-on
Judo
Jugemu
Jujutsu
Bishin Jumonji
Jusenkyo
Jushiyama, Aichi
Jūsō Station
Just In Time (business)
Justice (short film)
Juromaru

Jv
JVC

J